Infant Behavior and Development is a quarterly peer-reviewed scientific journal covering developmental psychology in infants. It was established in 1978 and is published by Elsevier. The editor-in-chief is Martha E. Arterberry (Colby College). According to the Journal Citation Reports, the journal has a 2017 impact factor of 1.669.

References

External links

Developmental psychology journals
Elsevier academic journals
Quarterly journals
Publications established in 1978
English-language journals